Cupido is a genus of butterflies in the family Lycaenidae. The subgenus Everes (Hübner, [1819]) is included here.

Species
 Cupido alaina (Staudinger, 1887) Alai, Darvaz, West Pamirs
 Cupido alcetas – Provençal short-tailed blue
 Cupido amyntula – western tailed-blue
 Cupido argiades – short-tailed blue
 Cupido buddhista (Alphéraky, 1881) – Buddhist blue – Central Asia
 Cupido carswelli Stempffer, 1927 – Carswell's little blue – mountains of southeast Spain
 Cupido comyntas – eastern tailed-blue
 Cupido decolor (Staudinger, 1886)
 Cupido decolorata (Staudinger, 1886) – eastern short-tailed blue – Balkans and eastern Europe
 Cupido gisela (Püngeler, 1901) – Gisela blue – Tibet
 Cupido lacturnus – tailed Cupid
 Cupido lorquinii (Herrich-Schäffer, [1851]) – Lorquin's blue – North Africa and Spain
 Cupido minimus – small blue – Europe, Asia Minor, Siberia and Mongolia
 Cupido osiris – Osiris blue – Europe, Asia Minor, Siberia and Mongolia
 Cupido peri Zhdanko, 2000 Alai, Darvaz
 Cupido prosecusa (Erschoff, 1874) Central Asia
 Cupido staudingeri (Christoph, 1873) – Staudinger's blue – Asia Minor
 Cupido tusovi Lukhtanov, 1994 Altai Mountains

References

External links

Lepidoptera and some other life forms
images representing Cupido  at Consortium for the Barcode of Life

 
Butterflies of Asia
Butterflies of Europe
Lycaenidae genera